"I'll Name the Dogs" is a song by Matt Dragstrem, Ben Hayslip, and Josh Thompson and recorded by American country music artist Blake Shelton. It was released on September 11, 2017, as the first single Shelton's 2017 album Texoma Shore (2017) and would be used for Shelton's other album Fully Loaded: God's Country.

Background and composition
"I'll Name the Dogs" was written by Matt Dragstrem, Ben Hayslip and Josh Thompson, while production was handled by Scott Hendricks.

Commercial performance
"I'll Name the Dogs" debuted at No. 23 on the U.S. Billboard Country Airplay chart for the week of September 28, 2017. That same week, the song first entered the Hot Country Songs at No. 40. It became available for sale the following week, and was the second best-selling country song that week with over 27,273 copies sold. This helped the song move up to No. 10 on Hot Country Songs.  As of January 2018, "I'll Name the Dogs" has sold 185,000 copies in the United States. The song was certified Gold by the RIAA on July 13, 2018, and Platinum on July 31, 2019 for a million units in sales and streams.

Charts

Weekly charts

Year-end charts

Certifications

References

2017 songs
2017 singles
Blake Shelton songs
Songs written by Ben Hayslip
Songs written by Josh Thompson (singer)
Warner Records Nashville singles
Songs written by Matt Dragstrem